epi-Cedrol synthase (EC 4.2.3.39, 8-epicedrol synthase, epicedrol synthase) is an enzyme with systematic name (2E,6E)-farnesyl-diphosphate diphosphate-lyase (8-epi-cedrol-forming). This enzyme catalyses the following chemical reaction

 (2E,6E)-farnesyl diphosphate + H2O  8-epi-cedrol + diphosphate

This enzyme is activated by Mg2+.

References

External links 
 

EC 4.2.3